Kite are a Swedish synthpop group composed of Nicklas Stenemo (The Mo, Melody Club) and Christian Berg (Yvonne, Strip Music, The April Tears). Originating from Malmö and now based in Stockholm, they are signed to Astronaut Recordings and have published six EPs since their debut in 2008, each of which was released on CD and as a limited vinyl record edition. They have performed at festivals like Recession Festival in Århus, Denmark, and Arvika Festival and Putte i parken in Sweden, and Wave Gotik Treffen Leipzig.

In 2020 they released new music with producer Benjamin John Powers.

Reception
Their eponymous debut EP Kite was reviewed favourably by the Side-Line magazine comparing it to classic 1980s synthpop acts like Erasure or Yazoo, while the German Sonic Seducer noted singer Stenemo's distinctive voice.  The EP Kite III was lauded for its original sound by Side-Line and Sonic Seducer, the latter marking a darker tone in this release. The release Kite IV has been seen as a mix of classic 1980s synthpop like OMD and modern, experimental sounds. Kite's sixth EP VI was released in 2015. It has been compared to the sound of Kraftwerk and Vangelis.

The 2010 single "Jonny Boy" reached position 49 in the Swedish charts.

Discography

Album

EPs

Singles

Appearances
Sweat Boys "Endlessly" feat. Nicklas Stenemo of Kite (2019)

References

External links
Discogs
Official myspace site
Official YouTube channel

Swedish synthpop groups
Swedish musical duos
Musical groups established in 2008
2008 establishments in Sweden